Kiran Reddy (born 4 December 1996) is an Indian cricketer. He made his Twenty20 debut for Nagaland in the 2018–19 Syed Mushtaq Ali Trophy on 25 February 2019.

References

External links
 

1996 births
Living people
Indian cricketers
Nagaland cricketers
Place of birth missing (living people)